"Inside Out" is a song by American DJ duo The Chainsmokers. It features vocals from Swedish sing and songwriter Charlee Nyman  and was released on April 1, 2016, through Disruptor Records and Columbia Records.

Critical reception
Matt Medved of Billboard labeled it a "softer-edged song" and said it was a "welcomed shift." Writer of US magazine, Vents, RJ Frometa said "Showing no signs of slowing down, The Chainsmokers continue their unprecedented release schedule delivering fans a new song every month. Their latest offering, 'Inside Out' ft. Charlee, starts off toned-down, allowing the [Swedish] singer's captivating vocals to take the lead, before building to the song's high point and showcasing the duo's signature sound and style."

Track listing

Charts

Weekly charts

Year-end charts

Certifications

Release history

References

The Chainsmokers songs
2016 songs
2016 singles
Columbia Records singles
Electronic dance music songs
Songs written by Andrew Taggart
Disruptor Records singles